Tumhari Natasha (English:Your Natasha) is a 2015 Pakistani romantic drama serial aired on Hum TV. The series is directed by Fahim Burney and produced by Hammad Abbas. The show airs every Friday at 9:10 pm.

Plot
Series spins around the fundamental lead Natasha, little girl of an effective businessman Afnan Adil and Dur-e-Shahwar. Conceived with a silver spoon in her mouth, Natasha has every one of the enhancements one could wish for in their life yet the one thing she wishes the most for - an existence of bliss and love with her parents which is absent as they are regularly inconsistent with each other. Natasha venerates her companion Sumbal's parents Farooq Sahib and Shahnaz Begum, who are an impeccable photo of a glad couple and who have made their home a shelter of affection, care and mutual respect. The story takes an energizing turn when the pressure between her parents develops and they choose to split up. Natasha needs to pick between her parents however rather leaves on an arrangement that may spare her from settling on a decision. The series then shows how Natasha's arrangement works, leading her to much further dissatisfaction.

Cast
Sohai Ali Abro as Natasha
Azfar Rehman as Ahmer
Farhan Ahmed Malhi as Kaif
Saba Hameed as Natasha's mother
Adla Khan as Sumbul
Waseem Abbas as Natasha's father
Asma Abbas as Ahmer's mother
Tariq Jamil
Asad Mahmood

References

External links
 Official website

Hum TV original programming
Urdu-language television shows
Pakistani drama television series
2015 Pakistani television series debuts
2015 Pakistani television series endings